Khvajeh Marjan (also Romanized as Khvājeh Marjān; also known as Haji Mijan and Khadzhi Myurdzhan) is a village in Chelleh Khaneh Rural District, Sufian District, Shabestar County, East Azerbaijan Province, Iran. At the 2006 census, its population was 631, in 152 families.

References 

Populated places in Shabestar County